Konanur is a mid level town in the southern state of Karnataka, India. It is located in the Arkalgud taluk of Hassan district in Karnataka.

Demographics

As of 2001 India census, Konanur had a population of roughly 9702 with 4890 males and 4812 females, konanur is located on the shore of river cauvery and it is located in state highway SH85 & SH95 in border of hassan district as trianguler border it covers from kodagu and mysore districts. Konanur received times (2018 & 2019) Gandhi gram award from state government. 

State second largest hanging bridge was constructed in river cauvery to create connectivity between Kattepura and Konanur, Arasikatte Amma temple is the famous temple near by Konanur, and it has a good bus connectivity from Hassan, Mysore, Bengaluru,Kushalanagar and Madikeri.

Image gallery

Villages of konanuru

Doddabommenahalli
Chikkabommenhalli
Siddapura gate
Banugondi
Ullenahalli
Siddapura
Handrangi
Shigodu
Arasikatte Kaval
Chikkahalli
Kerekodi
Kaduvina Hosahalli
Kesavatthur
Bidarur

See also 

 Saligrama. Mysore
 Holenarasipura
 Mangalore
 Arkalgud

References

External links
 http://Hassan.nic.in/

Villages in Hassan district